Rodrigo Mascarenhas (born March 24, 1980) is a Cape Verdean-Portuguese basketball player for Benfica.

Professional career
Mascarenhas played professional basketball in Portugal with F.C. Porto. He then joined countryman Marques Houtman on Angolan side Primero de Agosto at the 2007-08 season  and then played for another Angolan team, ASA.

National team career
Mascarenhas currently is the captain of the Cape Verde national basketball team. At the 2007 FIBA Africa Championship, after leading the Cape Verdeans to a surprise third-place finish in the tournament. he was named to the All-Tournament team.

References

1980 births
Living people
Cape Verdean men's basketball players
C.D. Primeiro de Agosto men's basketball players
FC Porto basketball players
S.L. Benfica basketball players
Cape Verdean expatriate basketball people in Portugal
Cape Verdean expatriate basketball people in Angola
Power forwards (basketball)
Small forwards
Sportspeople from Rotterdam
Portuguese men's basketball players
Atlético Sport Aviação basketball players
Ginásio C.F. basketball players

Portuguese people of Cape Verdean descent